Sandtracks is the 2007 debut album of the Sahrawi band Tiris, published by Sandblast Arts on November 7. A special digital edition was released on October 5 through Believe Digital. The album was re-released in 2011.

Track listing 

Digital edition bonus track

References

External links 
 Sandtracks review - Songlines magazine

2007 debut albums
Tiris (band) albums
Reggae albums
Jazz albums by Sahrawi artists
Folk albums by Sahrawi artists
Arabic-language albums